The spotted fanfish (Pteraclis velifera) is a species of pomfret found in the Indian and western Pacific oceans from South Africa to New Zealand. It reaches a length of  TL.

References
 Tony Ayling & Geoffrey Cox, Collins Guide to the Sea Fishes of New Zealand,  (William Collins Publishers Ltd, Auckland, New Zealand 1982) 

Bramidae
Fish described in 1770